Keelin Godsey (born Kelly Godsey, January 2, 1984, in Massachusetts) was the first openly transgender athlete to compete for a spot on the United States Olympic team. Godsey was assigned female at birth, has openly identified as male since 2005, and competed in women's hammer throw competitions.

Early life and education
Godsey graduated in 2006 with a bachelor's degree in English from Bates College.

Women's hammer throw

Collegiate competition
Godsey won two national collegiate championships in the women's hammer throw.
He set the NCAA Division III record in the hammer throw twice (in 2005 and 2006), a record which he still held as of May 2015. He earned All-America status in four different throwing disciplines: shot put, weight throw, discus throw, and hammer throw. He was named USTFCCCA New England Region track and field athlete of the year twice, and was named to the NCAA Silver Anniversary Division III track and field championship team.

U.S. Olympic trials and international competition
At the 2008 U.S. Olympic trials for the 2008 summer Olympics, Godsey finished in eighth place in the hammer throw.

In 2011, Godsey finished third at the USATF national championships, earning a spot on the U.S. team at the 2011 Pan Am Games, where he finished fifth in the hammer throw.

Hammer throw season bests 

Source:

References 

Transgender men
Transgender sportspeople
Living people
1984 births
People from Massachusetts
American hammer throwers
LGBT people from Massachusetts
American LGBT sportspeople
LGBT track and field athletes
Athletes (track and field) at the 2011 Pan American Games
Pan American Games track and field athletes for the United States
Bates Bobcats women's track and field athletes